Persikokot, or Perserikatan Sepakbola Indonesia Kota Kotamobagu, is an Indonesian football club based in Kotamobagu, North Sulawesi. Their currently plays at Liga 3 and their home stadium is the Nunuk Matali Stadium.

References

Kotamobagu
Football clubs in North Sulawesi
Football clubs in Indonesia
Association football clubs established in 2007
2007 establishments in Indonesia